Pterostylis echinulata, commonly known as the hairy-leafed snail orchid, is a species of orchid endemic to the south-west of Western Australia. Both flowering and non-flowering plants have a compact rosette of leaves flat on the ground and flowering plants have a single pale yellowish-green flower.

Description
Pterostylis echinulata is a terrestrial, perennial, deciduous, herb with an underground tuber and a compact rosette of leaves  in diameter. The dorsal sepal and petals are fused, forming a slightly inflated hood or "galea" over the column. The labellum is broad but not visible from outside the flower. Flowering occurs in June and July.

Taxonomy and naming
Pterostylis echinulata was first formally described in 2014 by David Jones and Christopher French from a specimen collected near Kulin and the description was published in Australian Orchid Review. The species had previously been known as Pterostylis sp. 'hairy leaf'. The specific epithet (echinulata) is a Latin word meaning "with very small prickles, alluding to the impression imparted by the siliceous cells present on the leaves, scape and ovary of this species".

Distribution and habitat
The hairy-leafed snail orchid grows under small shrubs in open woodland in the Mallee biogeographic region.

Conservation
Pterostylis echinulata is classified as "Priority One" by the Western Australian Government Department of Parks and Wildlife, meaning that it is known from only one or a few locations which are potentially at risk.

References

echinulata
Endemic orchids of Australia
Orchids of Western Australia
Plants described in 2014